Comephorus baikalensis, the big Baikal oilfish, is a species of freshwater ray-finned fish belonging to the family Cottidae, the typical sculpins. This fish is endemic to Lake Baikal in Russia.

References

baikalensis
Taxa named by Peter Simon Pallas
Fish described in 1776
Fish of Lake Baikal